Haiwan is a 1977 Bollywood musical film thriller directed by Ram Rano.

Cast
Deb Mukherjee   
Joy Mukherjee   
Prema Narayan   
Nazneen

Songs
"Humdum Jhoom Le Zara Mausam Bhi Hai Pyaar Ka" - Mohammed Rafi
"Dekho Ye Naari Hai Khota" - Kishore Kumar
"Jaane Na Jaane Na Dil Lena" - Krishna Mukherjee
"Jai Jai Ma" - Krishna Mukherjee
"Maan Na Maan Mai Teri Mehmaan" - Krishna Mukherjee, Amit Kumar
"Mai Haiwan Hu Haiwan Hu" - Bappi Lahiri
"Monalisa O Meri Jaan" - Krishna Mukherjee, Shailendra Singh
"O Deewani Raja Raani Kahani" - Amit Kumar
"Pyari Pyari Rut Deewani Mere Sathi" - Krishna Mukherjee, Manhar Udhas
"Pagal Pagal Hai Ye Mausum" - Hemant Kumar, Asha Bhosle

External links
 

1977 films
1970s Hindi-language films
1970s slasher films
Films scored by Bappi Lahiri
Indian slasher films